Tis the Season to Be Fearless is the first holiday-themed compilation album series created by Fearless Records featuring eight Christmas-themed songs. It was released on November 22, 2010. It was made available for pre-order on iTunes on November 8, 2010.

Track listing

References

2010 compilation albums
Pop rock compilation albums
Alternative rock compilation albums
Post-hardcore compilation albums
Fearless Records compilation albums